Pann Kyar Wutt Hmone (also spelt Pan Kyar Wut Hmone) is a romantic campus novel written by Burmese author Khin Khin Htoo. Set most of its storyline in Mandalay and Mandalay Arts and Science University, the novel was adapted into the 2011 film of the same name. The book was first published in 2008 by Duwun Publication.

Synopsis

Plot

The story is set in three timelines: 1980s, 1990s and 2000s.

Main characters
 Aung Naing Thu, a descent of then-demolished Shan Saopha family, is a student at Mandalay University, majoring in Burmese literature.
 Thiri May is a chemistry major student at Mandalay University.

Legacy

Film version

Directed by Sin Yaw Mg Mg, the novel's film adaptation was released in 2011. Starred by Nine Nine and Thet Mon Myint as Aung Naing Thu and Thiri May respectively, the film won the Myanmar academy awards in two categories: Best Cinematography and Best Sound.

References

Burmese novels
Burmese novels adapted into films
Novels set in the 20th century
Novels set in the 21st century
Campus novels
Burmese romance novels